David Clements may refer to:

 David Clements (figure skater) (born 1939), British figure skater
 David Clements (ice hockey) (born 1994), English ice hockey player 
 Dave Clements (born 1945), Northern Irish footballer
 David R. Clements (1819–1884), American politician